This is a discography of the  entries for the Eurovision Song Contest, featuring the highest chart placing attained on the UK Singles Chart.

1957–1969

1970–1989

1990–2009

2010–present

See also 
 UK national selection for the Eurovision Song Contest
 List of contestants from the UK national selection for the Eurovision Song Contest

Notes and references

Notes

References 

Discography
Eurovision Song Contest (UK)